Wave 91.7 FM, is a mixed news, talk, and music radio station based in Port Harcourt, Nigeria. The station began operating on a regular basis on 1 September 2011. It is currently owned by South Atlantic Media and broadcasts from studios in 30 Forces Avenue, Old GRA at the frequency of 91.7 on the FM band.

Line Up

Presenters
Kelly Igbeye
Excel Uwaezuoke
Peace Pollyn
Amaka Anaemeje
Ruth Ejiroghene
George Ukaegbu

Engineers 

 Okonkwo Chijioke Phone Site

See also

List of radio stations in Port Harcourt

References

External links

91.7 Wave FM Website

Radio stations established in 2011
Radio stations in Port Harcourt
Companies based in Port Harcourt
2011 establishments in Nigeria
2010s establishments in Rivers State
Hip hop radio stations
Old GRA, Port Harcourt